The Brown-Young BY-1, also called the Columbia Sesquiplane and the Model 2, was a prototype sesquiplane from Columbia Aircraft Co.

Design and development
Richard E. Young was the inventor of Spiralloy, a directional glass fibre composite material used in high-strength applications. Together with Willis C. Brown he designed and built the BY-1, a four-seat equivalent to the two-seat Luscombe Phantom parasol monoplane. After completion, a smaller lower wing was mounted below the fuselage, converting it to a sesquiplane with backward staggered wings. The lower wing also housed the retractable landing gear main wheels.

The wings were fabric covered, while the fuselage was of all-metal construction and supported the non-retractable tailwheel. A single Jacobs radial engine in the nose drove a two-bladed propeller.

Operational history
The engine from the BY-1 was later installed in the prototype MB-10 trainer. The BY-1 was scrapped at White Rock Airport in Dallas, Texas for materials during the Second World War.

Specifications (Brown-Young BY-1)

See also

References

External links

Image of the BY-1
Image of the Columbia Sesquiplane
Profile of the BY-1

Sesquiplanes
Columbia Aircraft Corporation aircraft
Single-engined tractor aircraft
Biplanes with negative stagger